The Wave is an indoor waterpark situated in Coventry in the West Midlands, England. The waterpark currently holds the record for the largest wave pool in the UK, at a capacity of 20 million litres. The Wave caters for visitors of all ages with six slides of varying intensity and speed, along with a lazy river, wave pool and splash zone - The Reef - which hosts mini slides, jets, climbing area and giant tipping bucket.

The waterpark at The Wave opened on 21 October 2019, while the gym and the spa opened in July 2019. The building cost £36.7 million to build. The Wave has won an award from the World Waterpark Association.

The waterpark caters for all abilities with pool hoists and pods, free parking outside the building, disabled toilets and changing facilities. 

There is also an on-site cafe, Mana Spa, and state-of-the-art Lifestyles gym available to the public inside The Wave's main building.

Slides
A total of six slides are in operation at The Wave:

References

External links 
 

Buildings and structures in Coventry
Tourist attractions in Coventry
Water parks in the United Kingdom
2019 establishments in England